JaNice Van Ness (also spelled JaNice VanNess) is an American politician who served as a member of the Georgia State Senate from 2015 to 2017, representing the 43rd district, which includes parts of Rockdale County, Newton County, and Dekalb County.

In 2015, Van Ness, a Republican, ran for office in District 43 which was vacant due to the resignation of Ronald Ramsey. She narrowly defeated her opponent, Democrat Tonya Anderson, in a run-off election that took place on December 1, 2015.

In the November 2016 general election, Van Ness had a rematch with Anderson, which resulted in Van Ness' defeat.

Prior to serving in the state senate, Van Ness was a Rockdale County Commissioner for eight years, serving two terms. In 2014, she was defeated in a re-election bid by Doreen Williams (D). Van Ness also founded private schools in Rockdale and Newton County, called Peachtree Academy.

References

Living people
21st-century American politicians
Republican Party Georgia (U.S. state) state senators
Year of birth missing (living people)
21st-century American women politicians
Women state legislators in Georgia (U.S. state)